This list of protected areas in Frederikssund Municipality lists protected areas in Frederikssund Municipality, Denmark.

List

See also

References

Protected areas
Frederikssund